A list of windmills in Côtes-d'Armor, Brittany, France.

External links
French windmills website

Windmills in France
Cotes-d'Armor
Buildings and structures in Côtes-d'Armor